The Rebmann Glacier is an active glacier located near the summit of Mount Kilimanjaro in Tanzania. It is a small remnant of an enormous ice cap which once crowned Kilimanjaro. This ice cap has retreated significantly over the past century; between 1912 and 2000, 82 percent of the glacial ice on the mountain disappeared.

Rebmann Glacier is named for German missionary and explorer Johann Rebmann, who was the first European explorer to report observations of snow and glaciers atop Kilimanjaro, in 1848.

See also

Retreat of glaciers since 1850
List of glaciers in Africa

References

Glaciers of Tanzania
Pangani basin